Namazi Metro Station is a station on Shiraz Metro Line 1. The station opened on 11 October 2014. It is located on Namazi Square. This station is the southern terminus of the section that opened on 11 October 2014. Shihid Avini Station which is located north of this station opened in August 2016.

The station currently has one exit on the western side of the Bus Terminal area, however currently an elevator on the same side, an exit north of the Bus Terminal area next to the square, and another one north of the square on the western side of the boulevard leading to Namazi Bridge with underground access to Motahari and Emam Reza clinics are under construction.

Shiraz Metro stations
Railway stations opened in 2014